Tachytrechus angustipennis is a species of long-legged fly in the family Dolichopodidae. It is distributed across the United States, from California and Utah to Washington, D.C., south to Florida, and south to the Neotropical realm. It is also recorded from the Hawaiian Islands. Adults inhabit algal mats at Yellowstone National Park. The species is predatory, with their primary prey being Paracoenia eggs and larvae. Males are territorial.

References

Dolichopodinae
Articles created by Qbugbot
Insects described in 1862
Taxa named by Hermann Loew
Fauna of the Rocky Mountains
Diptera of North America
Diptera of South America